Beau Is Afraid is an upcoming American surrealist comedy horror film written, directed, and produced by Ari Aster. The film stars Joaquin Phoenix as the titular character, an anxiety-ridden man who embarks on a surreal odyssey home after his mother suddenly dies, confronting his greatest fears along the way. The film also includes a supporting ensemble cast that includes Nathan Lane, Patti LuPone, Amy Ryan, Kylie Rogers, Parker Posey, Stephen McKinley Henderson, Hayley Squires, Michael Gandolfini, Zoe Lister-Jones, and Richard Kind. 

Beau Is Afraid was co-produced and will be distributed by A24 on April 21, 2023.

Premise
Described as a "decades-spanning surrealist horror film set in an alternate present", Joaquin Phoenix plays  Beau, an "extremely anxious but pleasant-looking man who has a fraught relationship with his overbearing mother and never knew his father. When his mother dies, he makes a journey home that involves some wild supernatural threats".

Cast

Production
The film had been in development by Ari Aster for some time, with a 2011 short film entitled Beau, that would later serve as the basis for a sequence in the feature film, and a 2014 draft of the script that circulated on the internet.  Aster has described the film as a "nightmare comedy". In February 2021, A24 announced the film, then titled Disappointment Blvd., with Joaquin Phoenix on board to star in the leading role. The film's ensemble cast was announced in June and July. Co-star Stephen McKinley Henderson described Aster and Phoenix as "so simpatico ... their way of working together was like they were really old friends. They could get upset and make up in the span of seconds, it seemed. But the work was always the better for it." 

Principal photography began on June 28, 2021, and concluded that October. The film was shot in Saint-Bruno-de-Montarville, an off-island suburb of Montreal in Quebec, with cinematographer Pawel Pogorzelski and production designer Fiona Crombie.

Release
Beau Is Afraid is set to be released theatrically in the United States by A24 in April 21, 2023, following a delay from its original 2022 schedule.

References

External links
 
 

Upcoming films
2023 horror films
2023 films
American comedy horror films
Films directed by Ari Aster
A24 (company) films
Films shot in Montreal
2020s English-language films
2020s American films